The Maghreb Athletics Championships was an international athletics competition between athletes from countries of the Maghreb. The event was hosted eleven times during its existence from the late 1960s to 1990.

Organised by the Union des Fédérations d'Athlétisme du Maghreb Uni (UFAMU), the competition was first held in 1967. It was an annual competition until 1971, at which point it changed to a biennial format. The event schedule was disrupted after 1975, with the final four editions being held in 1981, 1983, 1986 and 1990. The competing nations were principally Algeria, Morocco and Tunisia, although Libya was present for a handful of editions (1969, 1981, and 1983).

After the discontinuation of the championships after 1990, the North African Athletics Championships was created in 2003, featuring all four participating nations from the Maghreb Championships. This ran for only two years. The disruption of these events reflected growing political disputes between the countries within the Arab Maghreb Union, particularly over sovereignty of the Western Sahara.

The UFAMU was founded in 1966 and held the inaugural Maghreb Cross Country Championships that same year. It was the first attempt to organise the sport of athletics at that regional level. Since the dissolution of the UFAMU, the four constituent countries continue to compete in the broader Arab Athletics Championships tournament.

The Maghreb Athletics Championships was roughly contemporaneous with the Maghreb Champions Cup and Maghreb Cup Winners Cup, two annual football competitions between the top Algerian, Moroccan and Tunisian association football clubs. These were also short-lived running from 1970 to 1976. Among other sporting events for the region, the Maghreb Student Cross Country Championships reached its 32nd edition in 2013, and a Maghreb Judo Youth Championships had its eighth event in 2009. The presidents of the Algerian and Tunisian National Olympic Committees proposed a Maghreb Olympics in 2013, representing increasing interest in sporting competition at the region level.

Editions

Participating nations

 (except 1981)

/ (1969, 1981, and 1983)

References

 
International athletics competitions
Maghreb
Athletics competitions in Africa
Athletics
Recurring sporting events established in 1967
Recurring sporting events disestablished in 1990
1967 establishments in Africa
1990 disestablishments in Africa
Sport in North Africa
Defunct athletics competitions